Rotation is a live album by multi-instrumentalist and composer Joe McPhee, recorded in 1976 and first released on the Swiss HatHut label.

Reception

Allmusic gave the album 3 stars.

Track listing 
All compositions by Joe McPhee
 "Sweet Dragon" - 6:55
 "Theme from Episode #3" - 5:20
 "Bahamian Folksong" - 10:55
 "Spaces" - 9:25
 "Rotation" - 6:35
 "Episode #2" - 8:15

Personnel 
Joe McPhee - tenor saxophone, soprano saxophone, trumpet, cornet, cowbell
John Snyder - synthesizer (tracks 3–6) 
Mark Levine - trumpet, flugelhorn, mellophone (track 6)

References 

Joe McPhee live albums
1977 live albums
Hathut Records live albums